Perla Dizon Santos Ocampo, MD ONS was a Filipina pediatrician.

Early life and education
Perla Santos-Ocampo was born in Dagupan, Pangasinan on July 25, 1931. She pursued a medical degree at the University of the Philippines Manila and graduated in 1955. She also pursued post-graduate pediatrics training at the UP-Philippine General Hospital, and a fellowship at Case Western Reserve University in Cleveland, Ohio in the United States.

Career
The policy of the Philippine Department of Health on diarrhea-related health concerns was based on Santos-Ocampo's research on diarrheal disease. Her research on the relation of malnutrition and child growth and development was instrumental to the country's fight against child malnutrition.

Santos-Ocampo also served as the Chancellor of the University of the Philippines Manila where she was noted for developing academic programs to increase the quality of health education offered by the university. She was also instrumental to the establishment of the National Institutes of Health, the National Graduate School of the Health Sciences, and the National Telehealth Center.

Santos-Ocampo was honored as a National Scientist of the Philippines on 2011.

Death
Perla Santos-Ocampo died on June 29, 2012. She died of respiratory failure due to colon cancer.

References

1931 births
People from Dagupan
University of the Philippines Manila alumni
Filipino pediatricians
National Scientists of the Philippines
2012 deaths
Deaths from colorectal cancer
20th-century Filipino medical doctors
21st-century Filipino medical doctors
Ihsan Doğramacı Family Health Foundation Prize laureates